Bibo is an unincorporated community and census-designated place in Cibola County, New Mexico, United States. As of the 2010 census it had a population of 140.

The Bibo Bar and Grill is located in the community. The Nextera Energy wind project is also being developed nearby. The town was named after the Bibo brothers, who settled in the area in the 1880s. Ben Bibo operated a trading post from 1895 to 1920.

Demographics

References

Census-designated places in New Mexico
Census-designated places in Cibola County, New Mexico